Eisenvogel is a Swiss book published by the Swiss-Tibetan writer, filmdirector (Who Killed Johnny) and actress Yangzom Brauen. The full title of the biography "Eisenvogel: Drei Frauen aus Tibet. Die Geschichte meiner Familie", literally means Iron bird, three women from Tibet, the history of my family. First published in 2009, the illustrated book is also distributed as paperback, eBook and audiobook in German language.

Plot summary 
Yangzom Brauen is of Tibetan origin and raised in the cantons of Thurgau and Bern, Switzerland, where she graduated, and migrated to Los Angeles, starring in some movies. She comes from a cosmopolitan family: Her father, a Bernese ethnologist, also moved to the US, and lives along with her mother, the Tibetan artist Sonam Dolma Brauen, in New York. Her grandmother lives in a student apartment in Bern. There are worlds between the world in which the grandmother grew up, and that the young actress. Her grandmother was a Bhikkhuni in eastern Tibet from where she moved when the 14th Dalai Lama refuged in 1959 to Dharamshala in northern India. Yangzom's mother was at the age of six when they crossed the Himalayas on foot, but Sonams father and little sister died. How the grandmother with all these strokes of fate handled, in so foreign worlds such as India, Switzerland and the US, is the central focus in Eisenvogel.

Title of the book 
After the annexation of Tibet, the dark prophecy of a monk from the eighth century fulfilled: «When the iron bird flies and horses on wheels rolling, then Tibetans will have to leave their homes like ants.» The title of the book refers to that prophecy.

Critical response 
The medial response in newspaper, radio and television is widely positive, and the book was listed on the bestselling lists in Switzerland and other German-speaking countries.

In 2009 the book became a best seller in the German-language area with over 100,000 copies sold.

International publishing 
Eisenvogel was also published in English in 2011:

Film, television and theatrical adaptations 
A film was announced in 2012, but is as of November 2014 not released respectively Yangzom Brauen starred as Tibetan woman in the 2012 film Escape from Tibet.

See also 
 Immigration to Switzerland
 Tibet Institute Rikon
 Tibetan diaspora

References

External links 
 Eisenvogel on the website of the Swiss television SRF

2009 novels
Biographies (books)
Tibetan diaspora in Switzerland
Novels set in Tibet
Novels set in Switzerland
Swiss novels
History of Tibet
Works about human migration
Tibetan diaspora in India
Novels set in India